Ramnaresh Ronnie Sarwan (born 23 June 1980) is a cricketer of Indo-Guyanese origin who played as a batsman. He is a former member and former captain of the West Indies cricket team, in all formats. Sarwan went on to average over 40 in both the test and one day international forms of cricket. He is considered to be one of the best batter of his generation.

He was named as captain of the Guyana Amazon Warriors for the 2013 inaugural tournament of the Caribbean Premier League. Sarwan also played for Guyana, Gloucestershire, Kings XI Punjab and Leicestershire in his cricketing career.

Youth career 
Sarwan first became fond of cricket at  primary school. He later became a member of the Georgetown Cricket Club, where he was mentored by the likes of Carl Hooper, Keith Semple and Roger Harper. Sarwan was a part of the Windies' squad for the 1998 Under-19 Cricket World Cup. The Caribbean side eventually lost to Bangladesh in the plate final. With a sum of 16 dismissals, he was the highest wicket taker at the tournament, in a tie with Mluleki Nkala of Zimbabwe.

International career

Rise in ranks
Sarwan made his Test debut against Pakistan at Barbados in May 2000 – a match in which he was unbeaten in both innings including a first innings score of 84 not out. He missed scoring his maiden Test century against South Africa in March 2001 when he was run out for 91. His score of 78 in the second Test against India at Chennai in October 2002 was his fourth innings of 75+ that was not converted into a century. His maiden Test century came in his next Test series against Bangladesh at Dhaka. His next Test century came against Australia at St. John's in May 2003. As a part-time right arm leg-break bowler, Sarwan picked up his best test bowling figures, in June 2004, with 4 for 37 against Bangladesh.

In September of that year, the Windies went on to win the final of the 2004 ICC Champions Trophy against England with Sarwan being named as the player of the tournament.

With an investigation being led in 2004 by the International Cricket Council into most of the world's international-class bowlers, Sarwan was found to be the only bowler tested who did not transgress the Laws of Cricket regarding the straightening of the arm during delivery.

On 23 May 2006, Sarwan scored 115 not out in his hundredth one day international. This was the third game of a five match odi series played against India at the Warner Park Sporting Complex in Basseterre, St. Kitts.

On 23 June 2006, on his 26th birthday, while playing against India Sarwan hit six fours in an over off Munaf Patel at St. Kitts' Warner Park Sporting Complex. In so doing he equalled the record of Sandeep Patil with six fours hit off Bob Willis from seven deliveries, Sanath Jayasuriya with six fours hit off James Anderson in six balls and Chris Gayle with six fours hit off Matthew Hoggard from six deliveries.

Sarwan was dropped from the side for the second Test against Pakistan in November 2006. It was the first time in his six-year career that he had missed a game due to poor form. According to captain Brian Lara "It wasn't designed as a drop. We just wanted to make him aware of the situation and come back stronger. We need him and we need him to take control."

Captaincy
On 29 April 2007 it was announced that Sarwan was to succeed the retiring Brian Lara as captain of the West Indies following the side's exit from the 2007 World Cup.

During the second Test in the West Indies tour of England in May 2007, Sarwan injured his shoulder when he collided with a boundary fence while attempting to prevent a four. This shoulder injury ruled him out of the remainder of the tour and for a further ten months.

Post captaincy
Sarwan returned to the West Indies side in 2008 for the home series against Sri Lanka, as vice-captain to Chris Gayle. Throughout the series Sarwan scored over 50 in four consecutive innings, including a match-winning century, at an average of 77.75. He was also named man of the series for his batting feats.

In the subsequent 2008 Test series against Australia, Sarwan continued his fine batting form. With Sarwan scoring a half century and a matching saving 128 in the second Test at the Sir Vivian Richards Stadium in North Sound, Antigua. At the age 28 years, 228 days he became the youngest West Indian to reach the 5,000 runs milestone when he scored a century in the first test of the 2009 home series against England at Sabina Park in Jamaica. In scoring his 13th Test match century Sarwan equalled the record for the most centuries in the fourth innings – a record he shared until 2017 with Sunil Gavaskar and Ricky Ponting. He went on to notch his highest test innings score, being 291 in the first innings of the fourth test of the said series played in March 2009 at Barbados' Kensington Oval. Sarwan's knock equalled the highest test innings of  Vivian Richards which was also scored against England in 1976 at The Oval in South London.

Late career
Sarwan did however lose his central contract due to poor fitness and indifferent form. West Indies coach Ottis Gibson stated that leaving Sarwan out was a tough decision but he will make many contributions to the West Indies in the future and that he needs time to regain his form. Therefore, he wasn't selected for the tour of Sri Lanka along with regular wicket-keeper Denesh Ramdin.

He played his last international match as an ODI against India at The Oval on 11 June 2013. Sarwan announced his retirement from international cricket in September 2016.

Domestic career
In July 2005 Sarwan signed for English county cricket team Gloucestershire.  He later joined Indian Premier League outfit Kings XI Punjab for their 2008 season.

Having fallen out of international favour, Sarwan went on to sign for English county side Leicestershire for the 2012 English season. Sarwan had an impressive debut season in averaging 40.91 for the County Championship side. During December 2012 Sarwan was appointed Leicestershire's new skipper replacing former captain Matthew Hoggard.

Controversy
Sarwan was accused of corruption and match-fixing in 2011, but his charges were dismissed. West Indies cricket official Ernest Hilaire cited irresponsible reporting as the reason rumours spread that batsman Ramnaresh Sarwan was under investigation for match-fixing. In 2020, Chris Gayle called Ramnaresh Sarwan 'worse than global pandemic'. However, the Caribbean Premier League (CPL) decided to close controversial issue.

Style of play
For much of his career, Sarwan wore a bandana under his helmet whilst batting but dropped the practice due to a change in the design of helmet. He shared the habit of his fellow countrymen Shivnarine Chanderpaul and Narsingh Deonarine of marking his guard with a bail.

Personal Life
Sarwan was born to Kishan and Kumari Sarwan, as the eldest of their three children, in Wakenaam, an island in Guyana's Essequibo River. He later married Cindy Parsram as per Hindu rituals in 2013. They each have three children together.

Career best performances
as of 23 June 2013

References

External links

1980 births
Living people
People from Essequibo Islands-West Demerara
Indo-Guyanese people
Guyanese Hindus
Guyanese cricketers
Sportspeople of Indian descent
West Indies Test cricketers
West Indies Test cricket captains
West Indies One Day International cricketers
West Indies Twenty20 International cricketers
Cricketers at the 2003 Cricket World Cup
Cricketers at the 2007 Cricket World Cup
Cricketers at the 2011 Cricket World Cup
Gloucestershire cricketers
Guyana Amazon Warriors cricketers
Guyana cricketers
Leicestershire cricketers
Punjab Kings cricketers
Trinbago Knight Riders cricketers